The men's team event was part of the gymnastics programme at the 1928 Summer Olympics. It was one of seven gymnastics events for men and was the sixth Olympic men's team gymnastic championship.  Each national team dropped its two lowest scores on each apparatus to calculate the country's score for that apparatus; the five apparatus scores were then summed along with a team drill score to give a team total.

Results
Source: Official results; De Wael

References

Gymnastics at the 1928 Summer Olympics
Men's events at the 1928 Summer Olympics